Tiny Toon Adventures: Buster's Bad Dream is the second Tiny Toon Adventures-related game released on the Nintendo Game Boy Advance. It was released on July 5, 2002 in Europe and was developed by Treasure Co. Ltd and published by Swing! Entertainment Media AG.

In 2005, a North American version of the game began popping up on eBay and at small retailers, published by Treasure-regular Conspiracy Entertainment as Tiny Toon Adventures: Scary Dreams. Aside from the title screens and legal information, it was virtually unchanged from the European version of the game. According to information on the box, copies of the game appear to have been produced in 2002 and shelved between then and the time it surfaced. Only a few copies of this version made it to the market.

Another game (also developed by Treasure under the supervision of Hitmaker), Astro Boy: Omega Factor, used some gameplay ideas from this game, particularly regarding the way enemies could be knocked into each other.

Buster's Bad Dream is the last Tiny Toon game to be developed and published. The next game in the series, Tiny Toons: Defenders of the Universe, was to be released in 2002, but was cancelled for unknown reasons, despite its development being completed. Since the TV show was discontinued ten years earlier and the last Tiny Toon Adventures-related animated production was the 1995 television special Tiny Toons Night Ghoulry, this game also marks the last official appearance of the show's characters until the upcoming 2022 reboot, Tiny Toons Looniversity.

Gameplay
Buster Bunny is having bad dreams and he aims to stop them. This game features a "partner system" that allows players to team up with other characters. The side-scrolling action features a unique take on fighting, allowing combos and more. The partners include:

Babs Bunny
Plucky Duck
Hamton J. Pig
Dizzy Devil
Shirley the Loon
Fifi La Fume
Li'l Sneezer

External links

2002 video games
Beat 'em ups
Game Boy Advance games
Game Boy Advance-only games
Video games based on Tiny Toon Adventures
Video games developed in Japan
Treasure (company) games
Video games about nightmares

Single-player video games
Conspiracy Entertainment games
Swing! Entertainment games